Aqualung is the fourth studio album by the British rock band Jethro Tull, released on 19 March 1971, by Chrysalis Records. It is widely regarded as a concept album featuring a central theme of "the distinction between religion and God", though the band have said there was no intention to make a concept album, and that only a few songs have a unifying theme. Aqualung success signalled a turning point in the career of the band, which went on to become a major radio and touring act.

Recorded at Island Records' new London recording studio, it was their first album with keyboardist John Evan as a full-time member, their first with new bassist Jeffrey Hammond, and last album featuring Clive Bunker on drums, who quit the band shortly after the release of the album. Something of a departure from the band's previous work, the album features more acoustic material than previous releases; and—inspired by photographs of homeless people on the Thames Embankment taken by singer Ian Anderson's wife Jennie—contains a number of recurring themes, addressing religion along with Anderson's own personal experiences.

Aqualung is Jethro Tull's best-selling album, selling more than seven million units worldwide. It was generally well-received critically and has been included on several music magazine best-of lists. The album spawned two singles, "Hymn 43" and "Locomotive Breath".

Production

"My God" was recorded on 11–12 April 1970, followed by "Wond'ring Aloud" on 21 June, both at Morgan Studios. After an American tour, bass player Glenn Cornick was fired from the band, and was replaced with Jeffrey Hammond, an old friend of Ian Anderson. Aqualung would be Hammond's first album with the band. It would also mark the first time John Evan had recorded a full album with the band, as his only prior involvement was to provide several keyboard parts on the previous 1970 album, Benefit. In December, the album became one of the first to be recorded at Island Records' newly-opened recording studios on Basing Street in London. Led Zeppelin were recording their untitled fourth album at the same time. In an interview on the 25th anniversary edition of the album, Tull's bandleader Ian Anderson said that trying to record in that studio was very difficult, because of its "horrible, cold, echoey" feel. There were two recording studios at the location; Led Zeppelin worked in the smaller studio downstairs, while Tull got the larger studio, which was the main body of a converted church. The orchestral segments were arranged by Dee Palmer, who had worked with the band since 1968's This Was, and would later join as a keyboard player. The master reels were assembled at Apple Studios on 2 March 1971. Aqualung would be the last Jethro Tull album to include Clive Bunker as a band member, as he retired shortly after recording to start a family.

Musical style

The songs on the album encompass a variety of musical genres, with elements of folk, blues, psychedelia, and hard rock. The "riff-heavy" nature of tracks such as "Locomotive Breath", "Hymn 43" and "Wind Up" is regarded as a factor in the band's increased success after the release of the album, with Jethro Tull becoming "a major arena act" and a "fixture on FM radio" according to AllMusic. In a stylistic departure from Jethro Tull's earlier albums, many of Aqualung'''s songs are acoustic. "Cheap Day Return", "Wond'ring Aloud" and "Slipstream" are short, completely acoustic "bridges", and "Mother Goose" is also mostly acoustic. Anderson claims his main inspirations for writing the album were Roy Harper and Bert Jansch.

ThemesAqualung has widely been regarded as a concept album, featuring a central theme of "the distinction between religion and God". The album's "dour musings on faith and religion" have marked it as "one of the most cerebral albums ever to reach millions of rock listeners". Academic discussions of the nature of concept albums have frequently listed Aqualung amongst their number.

The initial idea for the album was sparked by some photographs that Anderson's wife Jennie took of homeless people on the Thames Embankment. The appearance of one man in particular caught the interest of the couple, who together wrote the title song "Aqualung". The first side of the LP, titled Aqualung, contains several character sketches, including the eponymous character of the title track, and the schoolgirl prostitute Cross-Eyed Mary, as well as two autobiographical tracks, including "Cheap Day Return", written by Anderson after a visit to his critically ill father.

The second side, titled My God, contains three tracks—"My God," "Hymn 43" and "Wind-Up"—that address religion in an introspective, and sometimes irreverent, manner. However, despite the names given to the album's two sides and their related subject matter, Anderson has consistently maintained that Aqualung is not a "concept album". A 2005 interview included on Aqualung Live gives Anderson's thoughts on the matter:

Drummer Clive Bunker believes that the record's perception as a concept album is a case of "Chinese whispers", explaining "you play the record to a couple of Americans, tell them that there's a lyrical theme loosely linking a few songs, and then notice the figure of the Aqualung character on the cover, and suddenly the word is out that Jethro Tull have done a concept album".

The thematic elements Jethro Tull explored on the album—those of the effects of urbanisation on nature, and of the effects of social constructs such as religion on society—would be developed further on most of the band's subsequent releases. Ian Anderson's frustration over the album's labelling as a concept album directly led to the creation of Thick as a Brick (1972), intended to be a deliberately "over the top" concept album in response.

Other songs
"Lick Your Fingers Clean" was recorded for Aqualung, but was not included on the album. The song was drastically re-worked as "Two Fingers" for Tull's 1974 album, War Child. "Lick Your Fingers Clean" was eventually released in 1988 on the 20 Years of Jethro Tull collection. It was then released as a bonus track on the 1996 and 2011 reissues of Aqualung.

Another song, "Wond'ring Again" was recorded on 21 June 1970 together with the original version of "Wond'ring Aloud" (included as one single seven-minute song on the Steven Wilson remaster of associated recordings 1970–1971, titled "Wond'ring Aloud, Again"), and was considered for release on the album before Anderson decided to drop it from the final track listing. "Wond'ring Again" was subsequently released on the compilation album, Living in the Past, in 1972. A re-recording of "Wond'ring Aloud" was included on Aqualung.  Glenn Cornick played bass on the song and says it is his favourite song he recorded with the band. Cornick also played bass on early studio recordings of "My God" and "a couple of other songs", though he did not say which they were.

Album cover

The album's original cover art by Burton Silverman features a watercolour portrait of a long-haired, bearded man in shabby clothes. The idea for the cover came from a photograph Anderson's wife took of a homeless man on Thames Embankment, and Anderson later felt it would have been better to have used the photograph rather than commission the painting. Ian Anderson recalls posing for a photograph for the painting, though Silverman claims it was a self-portrait.

The artwork was commissioned and purchased by Chrysalis Records head Terry Ellis in 1971. Silverman was paid a flat fee of $1,500 for the painting.  There was no written contract.  The artist says the art was only licensed for use as an album cover, and not for merchandising; he approached the band seeking remuneration for the additional uses, such as printing it on T-shirts and coffee mugs.

The original artwork for both the front and back covers are missing. They were apparently stolen from a London hotel room, or perhaps from Chrysalis' office during a robbery.   The original artwork for the interior gatefold painting was not taken during the robbery and is held by Terry Ellis.

Release

In April 1971, Aqualung peaked at number four on the UK Album Chart; when the CD version was released in 1996, it reached number 52. It peaked at No. 7 on the Billboard' North American pop albums chart; the single "Hymn 43" hit No. 91 on the Billboard Hot 100 chart. The album would go on to sell over seven million copies, and is the band's best-selling album. Aqualung was one of only two Jethro Tull albums released in quadraphonic sound, the other being War Child (1974). The quadraphonic version of "Wind Up", which is in a slightly higher key, is included on the later CD reissue of the album as "Wind Up (quad version)".

The single "Hymn 43" was released on 14 August 1971, and reached number 91 on the Billboard Hot 100 charts, spending two weeks in the chart. The song was the first single to chart by the band in the United States. It was later included in the video game Rock Band 2 as downloadable content; which also featured the album's title track.

The album was re-released in a 40th anniversary edition on 31 October 2011. The release contains a new stereo and 5.1 surround remix of the album by British musician and producer Steven Wilson, and comes in three different editions—a "collector's edition" containing the album on LP and two CDs, as well a DVD and a Blu-ray disc (with better sound quality than the DVD) and a hardback book;  a "special edition" containing the two CDs and an abridged version of the book; and an "adapted edition" containing two CDs (with 2 extra songs not included in the other two 40th anniversary editions) and 2 DVDs in a hardcover book (written content is the same as in the Collector's Edition book, only the Chronology differs slightly). Justifying the remix, Steven Wilson said: "Jethro Tull's Aqualung is ... a masterpiece, but was sonically a very poor-sounding record. So, some didn't rate it as highly as they should have. What we did with Aqualung was really make that record gleam in a way it never gleamed before. I think a lot of people, including myself, have come around to thinking that the album is a lot better than they even gave it credit for previously. So, there is certainly something very gratifying about being able to polish what was already a diamond and making it shine in a way it never has before". Additionally, according to mastering engineer Steve Hoffman there were tape stretching problems with the original session mixdown master, implying that many editions of the album used multigeneration copies as their source.

Critical receptionAqualung received mixed to favourable reviews from contemporary music critics. Rolling Stone magazine's Ben Gerson lauded its "fine musicianship", calling it "serious and intelligent", although he felt that the album's seriousness "undermined" its quality. Sounds said that its "taste and variety" made it the band's "finest" work. Aqualung was voted the 22nd best album of 1971 in The Village Voices annual Pazz & Jop critics' poll. Robert Christgau, the poll's creator, was more critical of the album in a 1981 review, and described Anderson's undeveloped cultural interests and negative views on religion and human behaviour as both boring and pretentious.

In retrospective reviews the album is generally lauded and viewed as a classic. AllMusic's Bruce Eder called Aqualung "a bold statement" and "extremely profound". In a review of the album's 40th anniversary re-release, Sean Murphy of PopMatters said that Aqualung "is, to be certain, a cornerstone of the then-nascent prog-rock canon, but it did—and does—exist wholly on its own terms as a great rock album, period". Murphy also praised the additional material featured on the release, finding that the new content was "where a great album gets even better". Paul Stump's History of Progressive Rock was more measured in its praise, saying that Aqualung made little advancement over the group's previous album, Benefit. He identified the improvements as the deeper, wider arrangements, and the diversions of the melody from the bassline accompaniments. He found the side two song cycle rambling but added that "if the lyrics were now tending towards the provocatively obscure, they were none the less possessed of some style, not least in their Blakean allusions". Steve Harris, the bass player for the heavy metal band Iron Maiden, has called Aqualung "a classic album", lauding its "fantastic playing, fantastic songs, attitude [and] vibe". Iron Maiden would go on to cover "Cross-Eyed Mary" as the B-side of their 1983 single "The Trooper".

AccoladesAqualung has also been appraised highly in retrospective listings, compiled by music writers and magazines. Martin Barre's solo on the album's title track was included in Guitarist magazine's list of "The 20 Greatest Guitar Solos of All Time" at number 20.

Track listing

1971 original release

Original North American Reprise Records pressings of Aqualung'' contained a slightly edited version of the title song, with its first three seconds (i.e., the first repetition of the song's signature riff) removed. These pressings correspondingly list the song's length at 6:31.

1996 CD reissue

2011 40th anniversary special edition

The 2011 version was remixed by Steven Wilson and remastered by Peter Mew.

CD 1: Original Album

2016 40th anniversary adapted edition

The 2016 edition was remastered by Steven Wilson of his 2011 remixed material as he did not like Peter Mew's mastering.

Personnel
Jethro Tull
 Ian Anderson – lead vocals, acoustic guitar, flute, production
 Martin Barre – electric guitar, descant recorder
 Jeffrey Hammond (as "Jeffrey Hammond-Hammond") – bass guitar, alto recorder, odd voices; backing vocals on "Mother Goose"
 John Evan – piano, organ, Mellotron
 Clive Bunker – drums and percussion

Additional personnel
 Glenn Cornick – bass guitar (played with the band at rehearsals for the album in June 1970, some of which may also have been recording sessions – particularly early versions of "My God" and "Wondring Again/Wondring Aloud" – although he is not credited on the album)
 John Burns – recording engineer
 Dee Palmer – orchestral arrangements and conducting
 Burton Silverman – album artwork
 Terry Ellis – producer

Charts

Album

Singles

Certifications

Footnotes

References

External links 
 
 My dad painted the iconic cover for Jethro Tull's ‘Aqualung,’ and it's haunted him ever since

Jethro Tull (band) albums
1971 albums
Chrysalis Records albums
Island Records albums
Reprise Records albums
Albums produced by Terry Ellis (record producer)
Albums produced by Ian Anderson
Concept albums